María del Mar Fernández (born 1 October 1978 in Cádiz) is a Spanish flamenco singer best known for her rendering of the song "Señorita" from the 2011 Hindi film Zindagi Na Milegi Dobara.

Career
María began her career as a singer at the age of 14 working with several dance schools of several famous flamenco artists, such as of Mª de Mar Gutierrez, Inma and Pilar Salazar Ogalla, among others. From 1993, she participated in Malaga, in the "Young Andalusian Flamenco Contest" (Certamen Flamenco para Jóvenes Andaluces) and began offering solo performances in clubs of Andalusia.

Later in 1999, she went to Japan to work for six months in the tablao "El Flamenco" in Osaka, with the dancers. She then worked for many famous flamenco artists, like Joaquín Cortés, Paco Peña and collaborated on several albums with veteran flamenco singer and composer Juan Villar on albums like "Gitanos de Santa Maria" and "Lorca and the Flamenco."

She made her film debut singing the Spanish parts of the flamenco song "Señorita" along with Bollywood actors Hrithik Roshan, Abhay Deol and Farhan Akhtar in the 2011 hindi film Zindagi Na Milegi Dobara by Zoya Akhtar.

Discography
 Gitanos de Santa Maria
 Lorca y el Flamenco
 "Señorita" - Zindagi Na Milegi Dobara

References

External links

 Official website

Flamenco singers
Flamenco-rock
People from Cádiz
Singers from Andalusia
1978 births
Living people
21st-century Spanish singers
21st-century Spanish women singers